Andrew Christopher Gilbert (born September 27, 2000) is an American professional baseball outfielder in the Houston Astros organization. He played college baseball for the Tennessee Volunteers.

Amateur career
Gilbert attended Stillwater Area High School in Stillwater, Minnesota. As a junior, he helped lead Stillwater to their first state championship since 1991, striking out 15 batters and throwing over 115 pitches in a complete-game shutout. He finished his junior year batting .400 alongside going 7–1 with a 0.63 ERA and 100 strikeouts over  innings. As a senior in 2019, he was named the St. Paul Pioneer Press Baseball Player of the Year, the Star Tribune Metro Player of the Year, and Minnesota Mr. Baseball. He finished his senior year with 97 strikeouts while giving up only one run over 49 innings alongside batting .370 with eight stolen bases. He was selected by the Minnesota Twins in the 35th round of the 2019 Major League Baseball draft but did not sign. He originally committed to play college baseball for the Oregon State Beavers, but switched his commitment to the Tennessee Volunteers after a coaching change at Oregon State during the summer before his freshman year of college.

During his freshman year at Tennessee in 2020, Gilbert pitched eight innings and made ten starts in the outfield before the season was cancelled due to the COVID-19 pandemic. As a sophomore in 2021, Gilbert became Tennessee's starting center fielder. He was named Southeastern Conference (SEC) Newcomer of the Week twice during the season. He garnered national attention after he hit an ultimate grand slam versus the Wright State Raiders in the first round of the 2021 NCAA Division I baseball tournament, leading the Volunteers to a 9–8 win. He was subsequently named the Most Outstanding Player of the Knoxville Regional after hitting a home run in all three games of the regional, helping Tennessee reach their first Super Regional in 16 years. He finished the season having started 67 games with a slash line of .274/.341/.437 with ten home runs, 62 RBIs, and ten stolen bases. 

Gilbert was named to the USA Baseball National Collegiate Team after the season alongside teammate Blade Tidwell. Gilbert returned as Tennessee's starting center fielder in 2022 and was named to the All SEC-First Team. During Tennessee's first game of the Super Regional versus the Notre Dame Fighting Irish, Gilbert was ejected and subsequently suspended one game for arguing a strike call. He returned for the third and final game of the Super Regional, but Tennessee lost, thus ending their season. Gilbert finished the season having appeared in 58 games, compiling a slash line of .362/.455/.673 with 11 home runs, 70 RBIs, and 21 doubles.

Professional career
The Houston Astros selected Gilbert in the first round, with the 28th overall selection, in the 2022 Major League Baseball draft. He signed with the team for $2.5 million. 

Gilbert made his professional debut with the Florida Complex League Astros, homering in his first at-bat. After four games, he was promoted to the Fayetteville Woodpeckers. His season ended in August after he dislocated his right elbow after a collision in the outfield. Over ten games for the season, he hit .313 with two home runs.

References

External links
Tennessee Volunteers bio

2000 births
Living people
Baseball players from Minnesota
Baseball outfielders
Tennessee Volunteers baseball players
United States national baseball team players
All-American college baseball players
Fayetteville Woodpeckers players